Rohan Babulal Kanhai (born 26 December 1935) is a Guyanese former cricketer of Indo-Guyanese origin, who represented the West Indies in 79 Test matches. He is widely considered to be one of the best batsmen of the 1960s. Kanhai featured in several great West Indian teams, playing alongside Sir Garfield Sobers, Roy Fredericks, Lance Gibbs, Clive Lloyd, and Alvin Kallicharran among others. C. L. R. James wrote in the New World journal that Kanhai was "the high peak of West Indian cricketing development", and praised his "adventuresome" attitude. Kanhai was part of the West Indian team that won the inaugural, 1975 Cricket World Cup.

Biography
Kanhai made his Test debut during the West Indies' 1957 tour of England and kept wicket for his first three Tests, in addition to opening the batting. Gerry Alexander took over the gloves for the last two Tests.  A right-handed batsman, Kanhai scored 6,227 runs in 79 Tests at a robust average of 47.53, with his highest score of 256 coming against India in a Test at Calcutta. When Kanhai retired, his batting average was the fifth-highest of all West Indian cricketers with more than 20 Tests. He was famous for his unorthodox shots, most notably the "falling hook" shot, in which he finished his follow-through lying on his back, famously during the West Indies' 1963 tour England when his innings of 77 at The Oval won the match for West Indies. In the 1975 World Cup final, when he was grey-haired and 40, his steady half-century set the platform for an explosive innings by Clive Lloyd.

Late in his career he became West Indies captain, succeeding Gary Sobers, giving the team more determination and resolve. After Kanhai's retirement, West Indies called on him to be their first national cricket coach. In charge of coaching the under-19s before being assigned to the Test team, Kanhai's selection was announced at the WICBoC annual general meeting in May 1992 to start work in the autumn of 1992 "for an as yet unspecified period". He resigned in 1995 in favour of Andy Roberts.

Throughout his first class cricket career Kanhai played for British Guiana, Guyana, North of South Africa (SACBOC), Tasmania, Transvaal (SACB) in the Howa Bowl, Trinidad, Warwickshire, and Western Australia.

In English county cricket for Warwickshire, he also played alongside Kallicharran, John Jameson, and Dennis Amiss. Kanhai scored 11,615 first class runs for Warwickshire at an average of 51.62, which is the highest for any batsman who played for the county for a considerable time.

The Indian opening batsman Sunil Gavaskar named his son Rohan after Kanhai, and wrote of Kanhai, "To say that he is the greatest batsman I have ever seen so far is to put it mildly."  Bob Holland, the Australian spin bowler, also named his son Rohan, in honour of Kanhai. There is a Wetherspoons pub in Ashington, Northumberland named after him in recognition of his time playing for Ashington Cricket Club during the 1963/64 season when he was brought in by Charlie Chisholm Senior and helped them win both the cup and the league. As one of the worlds best cricketers, his time at the club drew large crowds and his benefit match included many other first class players from the West Indies, including Garfield Sobers, Wesley Hall, Lance Gibbs and Seymour Nurse.

In 2009, Kanhai was inducted into the ICC Cricket Hall of Fame.

References

External links

WindiesFans.com A tribute to Rohan Kanhai

1935 births
Living people
West Indies One Day International cricketers
West Indies Test cricketers
Guyanese cricketers
Berbice cricketers
Commonwealth XI cricketers
Tasmania cricketers
Western Australia cricketers
Warwickshire cricketers
International Cavaliers cricketers
West Indies Test cricket captains
World Series Cricket players
Wisden Cricketers of the Year
Cricketers at the 1975 Cricket World Cup
Guyana cricketers
Guyanese Hindus
Indo-Guyanese people
People from East Berbice-Corentyne
Sportspeople of Indian descent
Guyanese cricket coaches
Coaches of the West Indies cricket team
A. E. R. Gilligan's XI cricketers